Nikola Yanachkov (born 13 January 1993) is a Bulgarian footballer, who currently plays as a midfielder for Chernomorets Balchik.

References

External links 
 

1993 births
Living people
Bulgarian footballers
PFC Levski Sofia players
PFC Vidima-Rakovski Sevlievo players
FC Vitosha Bistritsa players
FC Lyubimets players
PFC Spartak Varna players
PFC Lokomotiv Mezdra players
FC Chernomorets Balchik players
First Professional Football League (Bulgaria) players
Association football midfielders